Buffalo Creek is an unincorporated community and U.S. Post Office in Jefferson County, Colorado, United States.  The ZIP Code of the Buffalo Creek Post Office is 80425.

History
The town of Buffalo Creek was established about 1877 along the stream of the same name.  The Buffalo Creek Post Office opened on August 16, 1878.
  The town has been destroyed by fire several times.
The Colorado Trail is approximately 5 miles from Buffalo Creek. It is open for hiking, biking and camping. The Pike National Forest runs through Buffalo Creek where the elevation is 6500 to 6700 ft.

Geography
Buffalo Creek is located at  (39.386458,-105.269966).
Only parts of the pine forest in and nearby have been caught ablaze, not the entire area.

See also

Outline of Colorado
Index of Colorado-related articles
State of Colorado
Colorado cities and towns
Colorado counties
Jefferson County, Colorado
Jefferson County R-1 School District
Colorado metropolitan areas
Front Range Urban Corridor
North Central Colorado Urban Area
Denver-Aurora-Boulder, CO Combined Statistical Area
Denver-Aurora-Broomfield, CO Metropolitan Statistical Area

References

External links

Unincorporated communities in Jefferson County, Colorado
Unincorporated communities in Colorado
Denver metropolitan area